Farid Mansour may refer to:
 Farid Mansour (businessman)
 Farid Mansour (artist)